Lady Camilla may refer to:
Lady Camilla Bloch (born 1970), British barrister
Lady Camilla Dempster (née Osborne), only daughter of John Osborne, 11th Duke of Leeds

See also
Camilla, Duchess of Cornwall, sometimes mistakenly referred to as Lady Camilla